Palookaville may refer to:

 Palookaville (film), a 1995 comedy film
 Palookaville (album), a 2004 electronic album by Fatboy Slim
 Palookaville (comics), an alternative comic book

See also
Palooka (disambiguation)